Yvonne Der Kinderen (born 26 October 1965) is a Dutch former professional tennis player.

Der Kinderen had a career high singles ranking of 208 in the world and a best doubles ranking of 183. Her best singles performance on the WTA Tour came at the 1987 Argentine Open, where she won main draw matches against Gisele Faria and Karmen Skulj, then took a set off second seed Isabel Cueto in a third round loss.

Her daughter Merel Hoedt is a tennis player and competes on the professional tour.

ITF finals

Singles: 2 (1–1)

Doubles: 3 (2–1)

References

External links
 
 

1965 births
Living people
Dutch female tennis players